Bostanu (also Romanized as Bostānū) is a village in Gachin Rural District, in the Central District of Bandar Abbas County, Hormozgan Province, Iran. At the 2006 census, its population was 1,753, in 384 families.

References 

Populated places in Bandar Abbas County